is an action role-playing video game co-developed by Square Enix and Jupiter, and published by Square Enix in collaboration with Disney Interactive in 2004 for the Game Boy Advance. The game serves as an intermediary between the two larger-scale PlayStation2 games in the Kingdom Hearts series. It was one of the first GBA games to incorporate full motion video (FMV).

Kingdom Hearts: Chain of Memories is the second game in the Kingdom Hearts series. It is a direct sequel to Kingdom Hearts, and its ending is set about a year before Kingdom Hearts II. The game follows Sora and friends, as they explore the mysterious Castle Oblivion while battling the sinister Organization XIII, a group of antagonists new to the series. The game introduces new characters and plotlines that further expand the Kingdom Hearts universe and set up the premise for Kingdom Hearts II. The game features a new card-based battle system, in a departure from its predecessor's real time combat system.

Though not as successful as the other Kingdom Hearts games, it received positive reviews and sold well, with particular praise for its story, graphics, and FMVs, but the card-based battle system was criticized. When it debuted in Japan, it sold over 100,000 units in 48 hours. The game was remade for the PlayStation2 as Kingdom Hearts Re:Chain of Memories, released in Japan as a second disc packaged with Kingdom Hearts II Final Mix in March 2007. The remake was later released in North America on December 2, 2008 and was remastered in HD and included in the Kingdom Hearts HD 1.5 Remix collection released in 2013 for the PS3 and later for PS4, Xbox One, and PC.

Gameplay

Kingdom Hearts: Chain of Memories is a combination between a role-playing video game and collectible card game. The main role-playing aspect is an experience point system that is used to increase the character's maximum health or Card Points, or to learn a new skill. The cards are utilized in the progression of the story as well as in combat. The game features a field map and battle screen. The field map is an isometric area where the player can traverse between rooms. Enemies inhabit the field map and track the player to engage in combat, which can be initiated through contact between the player and an enemy. Once combat has been engaged, the game switches to the battle screen which utilizes a card-based battle system.

A unique aspect to this game is "room synthesis": to advance through the game, the player must utilize Map cards obtained after winning battles to synthesize rooms. The properties of each room―including quality of items and strength of enemies―are determined by the Map cards the player chooses. Each card has a specific effect: red cards affect the number and type of enemies; green cards affect the power of the player's deck; and blue cards affect the properties of the room itself, such as allowing treasure chests or a save point to appear.

The game features three modes of gameplay. The first two are story modes that feature either Sora or Riku, and the third is a two player battle mode. Initially only Sora's story mode is available; once completed, "Reverse/Rebirth" mode becomes available. Reverse/Rebirth allows the player to play a second story mode featuring Riku and a link mode where players can battle each other via a Game Link Cable.

Combat
Combat uses a card-based battle system executed in real time. The player can jump and maneuver around the battle screen as they would on the field map, but all physical attacks, magic, items and summonings are activated by playing cards. Cards are ranked from zero to nine, and are used for making attack combos or breaking enemy cards. With the exception of zero-ranked cards which are more expensive in terms of Card Points (CP) compared to other cards of the same type and have other ranks, more CP are required to place higher-ranked cards in the player's deck. Card Points—increased through level up—limit the number of cards the player can use in a deck. Cards with rank "zero" can break any opposing card or combo if played after the opposing card or combo, but they can be broken by any card or combo as well if it is played after the zero card is played. Breaking an opposing card will cancel that attack and stun the loser of a card break for a short time. Special enemy cards may be obtained by defeating enemies and bosses, and are used to give the player a temporary ability, ranging from enhanced offensive and defensive capabilities to modifying the attributes of certain cards.

Combining cards in sets of three will create combo attacks that are usually more difficult to break because the rank of the combo will be the sum of the ranks of the three cards in the combo. Certain card combinations will create a "sleight", a special combination that will create a powerful physical attack, magical spell, or summon attack. When the player runs out of cards, the deck must be reloaded. Additionally, using a card combination will cause the first card in the combo to become unusable until the end of combat.

Sora's and Riku's stories differ gameplay-wise in several ways. In Sora's story, Sora obtains cards by defeating enemies or through Moogle Shops. In some cases, Sora must earn the specific card first through a plot event before it becomes available. Sora can create and store three different decks in the pause menu. Unlike Sora, Riku has a closed deck that cannot be customized. The cards in his deck change depending on the world in which he is traveling. Riku is limited to mainly physical attacks, enemy cards and Mickey Mouse ally cards. He can activate "dark mode" and unlock his sleight attacks if he accumulates enough "dark points". Dark points are earned by breaking enemy cards and combos, and the difference between Riku's card or combo and the enemy's card or combo is how many dark points he will accumulate for that card break.

Plot

Setting

Kingdom Hearts: Chain of Memories is set immediately after the events of the first game. It is set in Castle Oblivion, a mysterious castle kept by Lord Marluxia. Sora and his teammates are told that the castle causes visitors to lose their memories upon entering. The lobby and areas between floors are white with flower-themed decorations, but each floor can be transformed into a different world from the first Kingdom Hearts game using "world cards" created from Sora's memories. Like before, many of the worlds of Disney and Square Enix reappear.

Unlike the previous game, the worlds are created from Sora's memories. As such, many of the events experienced in Kingdom Hearts are relived in this game, Sora encounters memory-based versions of Disney characters that he has met before (except Deep Jungle in Tarzan). The individual plotlines differ from those in the original game and revolve around the theme of memory. Just as Kingdom Hearts had several worlds created specifically for that game, Chain of Memories introduces Twilight Town as a world created from memories on "the other side of [Sora's] heart", in addition to the original worlds of Kingdom Hearts.

Characters

Sora returns as the game's protagonist. Donald Duck and Goofy are less involved in the gameplay and story. Like the first game, Chain of Memories features numerous characters from both the Final Fantasy series and the Disney animated features canon. Being a direct sequel, many of the characters from the first Kingdom Hearts reappear in this game. As each world and the related characters are recreated from Sora's memories, they interact with Sora as if they had never met before. The game also introduces a handful of new characters. Several are members of the enigmatic Organization. Other new characters include Naminé, a young girl capable of manipulating memories, and DiZ, a mysterious man concealed by red robes and bandages. Riku appears as a playable character in the second story mode. After being sealed in the realm of darkness, Riku heads to the basement of Castle Oblivion, aided by King Mickey Mouse and DiZ.

Six members of the Organization serve as antagonists; four appear in Sora's story mode, and the other two in Riku's. Among the four Sora encounters are Marluxia, the lord of Castle Oblivion; Larxene, Marluxia's assistant; Axel, a double agent with hidden loyalty; and Vexen, Marluxia's unwilling collaborator. Conversely, Riku battles Zexion and Lexaeus, Vexen's allies. Ansem also appears in Riku's story as an entity that attempts to control Riku. Many of the Disney villains return via memory-based recreations like the rest of the Disney characters.

Story
Sora, Donald, Goofy, and Jiminy Cricket walk down a winding path in search of Riku and King Mickey. A man dressed in a black, hooded coat appears and directs Sora towards a massive fortress called Castle Oblivion. Upon entering, the travelers realize that they have forgotten all their abilities. The hooded man explains that the deeper they go into the castle, the more memories they will lose, but they will also uncover new memories in the process. He creates a deck of cards made from Sora's and his friends' memories, and tells them that everything they encounter in this castle will be based on their memories.

Sora ascends the castle, facing off against other hooded figures who form a group called "the Organization" along the way. As Sora loses his memories, he gradually appears to remember a girl named Naminé as an old friend of his, and learns from Organization member Larxene that she is being held prisoner in the castle. He also clashes with a replica of Riku created and controlled by another Organization member, Vexen, and believed by both Sora and the replica himself to be the real Riku. Axel, an Organization double agent kills Vexen for his "betrayal" to the Organization, but later releases Naminé and allows her to meet Sora in person. Sora discovers Naminé to be the one manipulating his memories, having been forced to do so by Marluxia, the lord of Castle Oblivion and the figure who lured Sora there, as part of his plan to overthrow the rest of the Organization with Larxene. Marluxia also was responsible for Vexen's death by ordering Axel to kill him for disobeying Marluxia. Sora climbs to the highest floor and defeats Larxene and Marluxia, after which Naminé puts Sora and his friends into pod-like machines to help them regain the memories they have lost, even though they will forget the events that transpired in the castle. Before they are put to sleep, Sora and Naminé promise to meet again as real friends once he reawakens, Sora firmly believing that his memories of her and the castle will remain in his heart despite being forgotten.

In Reverse/Rebirth, which occurs congruently with the game's main story, Riku is transported from the realm of darkness to Castle Oblivion's deepest basement, and he fights figments of previous enemies to combat his inner darkness as he climbs upwards. Vexen fights Riku to obtain his data and creates his replica to counter Marluxia's plan. Ansem, still possessing Riku's body, tries to regain control of Riku, but Mickey's power keeps Ansem at bay. On the way, Riku battles and defeats Lexaeus, a member of Vexen's circle, only to be dragged into the realm of darkness. However, he is saved by Mickey when Ansem nearly succeeds in taking Riku's body as his own. With Marluxia eliminated by this time, another of Vexen's allies, Zexion, attempts to dispose of Riku by drowning him in light. Riku is saved by Naminé disguised as Kairi, who helps him to control his darkness, allowing him to defeat Zexion who later was drained of his life force by Riku Replica under Axel's (and by extention Saix's) orders. Riku later meets DiZ, an enigmatic individual interested in Riku who sends him to find Naminé. Riku's replica, who has since learned of his altered memories, seeks to justify his existence by killing Riku, only to be destroyed by him. Riku chooses to face Ansem upon learning from Naminé that Ansem lives in his heart, and defeats him after DiZ summons him for Riku to fight. Riku then sets out on a journey to utilize both his darkness and his light with Mickey as his companion.

Development

The idea for an intermediary title was developed after director Tetsuya Nomura and his team had already begun to develop ideas for the second Kingdom Hearts game, which he had intended to be set a year after the original. Originally titled Kingdom Hearts: Lost Memories, Nomura changed the name to match the overall outline of the story, while still reflecting the theme of memories. Chain of Memories was developed to bridge the gap between Kingdom Hearts and Kingdom Hearts II. Like most sequels, Kingdom Hearts II was planned to have the character start from the beginning, ability-wise. To explain the loss of abilities gained in the previous game, Nomura had the story revolve around Sora's memories getting corrupted and implemented the card battle system to symbolize Sora's various memories.

Nomura was hesitant about releasing a Kingdom Hearts title on the Game Boy Advance, feeling that the 3D graphics of the original game would not translate well into 2D. Nomura changed his position after hearing that children wanted to play Kingdom Hearts on the GBA. After exploring ideas for the gameplay, he felt that a 2D Kingdom Hearts game would be possible, and that it could still feel like and play like what gamers were used to in the original. Meanwhile, Nomura wanted to give the game a "lighter tone" than the PlayStation2 games.

Chain of Memories was announced along with Kingdom Hearts II at the Tokyo Game Show in September 2003. Initial details included the switch to 2D graphics, the use of cards to perform attacks, and that compressed movies would be utilized in some cut scenes. The cut scene animations were rendered using the graphical engine of the PlayStation2 iteration and then encoded for the Game Boy Advance by using a technology developed by Japanese company, AM3. To help market the game, Disney and Square Enix launched official Japanese websites. A playable demo was first made available to the public at the 2003 Jump Festa in Japan; this demo and subsequent demos highlighted the card-based combat system. Aside from information gathered from the opening sequences, most details regarding the story were kept secret until the release.

The card-based gameplay of Chain of Memories would later serve to inspire the gameplay of Jupiter's next game, The World Ends with You; originally, the team envisioned a similar card game-based system taking place on the lower screen of the Nintendo DS, but eventually this morphed to a battle system taking place on both screens, with a card game controlled on the upper screen.

Audio

Additional and reworked tracks were created for its PlayStation2 rerelease, Kingdom Hearts Re:Chain of Memories. Since the music is reused from the original, a Chain of Memories soundtrack was never released. The new reworked tracks, however, are included on two CDs in the Kingdom Hearts Original Soundtrack Complete.

Due to the technological limitations of the Game Boy Advance cartridge size, voice acting was kept to a minimum. Though many characters from Kingdom Hearts were voiced by the cast from before, the Japanese version used the following voice actors: Keiji Fujiwara as Axel; Tatsuya Kando as Vexen, Marluxia, and Lexaeus; and Rieko Katayama as Larxene. A limited amount of voice acting was added only for the battle sequences. Voice clips from the first Kingdom Hearts were inserted into Chain of Memories. The English version is absent of dialogue; voices during Organization battles are replaced with simple grunts, laughter, and other battle cries.

Versions and merchandise

Like its predecessor, a great deal of merchandise was produced to help market the release of the game. Square Enix released two products to coincide with the release of the video game. The first was a limited edition Kingdom Hearts Game Boy Advance SP set released only in Japan. The set contained the game, a "Kingdom deep silver" GBA SP with the Kingdom Hearts logo, and a carrying strap. The second was a Kingdom Hearts trading card game produced by Tomy. The TCG featured starter decks, playing mats, and booster packs. Fantasy Flight Games later acquired the rights to market it to English-speaking countries. In 2007, a remake for the PlayStation 2, titled Kingdom Hearts Re:Chain of Memories was released along with Kingdom Hearts II Final Mix in a set, Kingdom Hearts II Final Mix+. A manga series ran in Monthly Shōnen Gangan in Japan, and was later released in the United States. It is accompanied by three novels—two set during Sora's storyline and the third during Reverse/Rebirth, Riku's story. Like with the Final Fantasy games and the first Kingdom Hearts game, Square released an Ultimania book on Kingdom Hearts: Chain of Memories following the release of the game. In North America, BradyGames released a strategy guide with a comprehensive walkthrough.

Re:Chain of Memories

Kingdom Hearts: Chain of Memories was remade for the PlayStation 2, titled Kingdom Hearts Re:Chain of Memories. It was developed by Square Enix's fifth Product Development Division, based in Osaka, and released as the second disc of Kingdom Hearts II Final Mix+ in Japan on March 29, 2007 and as a standalone title in North America on December 2, 2008. It has not been released in Europe or Australia for the PlayStation 2, but has seen a worldwide release as part of Kingdom Hearts HD 1.5 Remix. The remake includes polygonal 3D battles and worlds using the same graphics as Kingdom Hearts, as well as voice acting and an improved soundtrack. While the card-based battle system and room synthesis aspects of the gameplay stayed mostly the same, there were additions, such as the "Reaction Command" function from Kingdom Hearts II. Voice-acted scenes occur only in Castle Oblivion, as well as in the Destiny Islands and Twilight Town simulations. The remake also includes new cutscenes and battles that were not in the original game. IGN ranked it as the 92nd best PlayStation2 game. The staff felt that it stood out among other card-based RPGs.

Manga
Like the first Kingdom Hearts, Chain of Memories was adapted into a manga by Shiro Amano, following the same plot as the video game. It was serialized in Square's Monthly Shōnen Gangan in Japan, then released in two volumes in Japan and later in the United States by TOKYOPOP. The first volume was released in Japan on October 22, 2005. A year later, it was released in English on October 10, 2006, followed by the second volume on February 6, 2007.

The manga series has had moderate success. The first volume was ranked 112th on USA Today's "Top 150 best sellers" during the week of its release. IGN praised Amano's renditions of the characters and the humor added into scenes. They also commented the weak elements of the game lessened the manga's overall quality. The series was followed by a third manga series, Kingdom Hearts II. The Chain of Memories manga series was re-released in a boxed set in the United States on October 9, 2007.

HD 1.5 Remix

In September 2012, Square Enix announced Kingdom Hearts HD 1.5 Remix a compilation for the PlayStation3 to include both Kingdom Hearts Final Mix and Re:Chain of Memories in high definition and trophy support. Additionally, the collection includes HD cinematic scenes from Kingdom Hearts 358/2 Days. It was released in Japan on March 14, 2013 and in North America on September 10, 2013. Releases on September 12, 2013 for Australia and September 13, 2013 for Europe marked the first time Re:Chain of Memories was available in both of those territories. This version was later ported to the PlayStation4 as part of Kingdom Hearts HD 1.5 + 2.5 Remix, released in March 2017.

Reception

While the least successful in the series commercially, Chain of Memories received generally positive reviews and met with successful sales figures. In Japan, it sold 104,000 units in 48 hours, a record for a Game Boy Advance title at the time. Its positive debut sales placed it in the top spot of sales charts in Japan. In the first month of its North American release, it was ranked 1st on GameSpot ChartSpot for portable systems and 6th for all consoles. By February 2005, it had sold over one million copies in Japan and North America. Worldwide sales of the game reached 1.50 million copies by the end of 2006. In the United States alone, it sold 900,000 copies and earned $28 million by August 2006. During the period between January 2000 and August 2006, it was the 24th highest-selling game launched for the Game Boy Advance, Nintendo DS or PlayStation Portable in that country. By late 2009, Chain of Memories had sold over 1.55 million copies worldwide, with 200,000 in PAL regions, 410,000 in Japan, and 940,000 in North America.

The game received mostly positive reviews from critics. The card-based battle system received mixed reviews. GameSpot called it "unwieldy", while GameSpy called it "engaging" and Game Watch called it original. Reviews also cited that the card battle system was awkward and made it difficult to plan strategies. G4 commented that the gameplay was well suited for portable play and that it successfully combined card battles and random dungeons, "two much-maligned RPG" elements. Some critics found the Room Synthesis to be far too linear. The most frequent praise went towards the story. IGN called it an "engrossing storyline that actually changes up after the adventure comes to an end" and rated the presentation a 10 out of 10.

The quality of the graphics was well received, particularly the cut scenes. IGN cited them as "wonderfully produced FMV sequences". GameSpot stated that the movies were true to the art style of the original and were on par with GBA video paks. They also commented on the detailed and well animated game sprites. Game Watch described the event scenes as "high quality". Many critics stated that though the graphics were not as good as the PlayStation2 predecessor, they were very good for a GBA game. G4 complimented the graphics stating that Chain of Memories was "one of the best-looking GBA games out there."

See also
 List of Disney video games

Notes

References

External links

 Kingdom Hearts: Chain of Memories Japan official website
 

2004 video games
Action role-playing video games
Digital collectible card games
Crossover role-playing video games
Disney video games
Donald Duck video games
Game Boy Advance games
Jupiter (company) games
Kingdom Hearts
Mickey Mouse video games
Multiplayer and single-player video games
PlayStation 2 games
Square Enix games
The Nightmare Before Christmas
Video games developed in Japan
Video games set in Greece
Video games set in the Middle East
Video games directed by Tetsuya Nomura
Video games scored by Yoko Shimomura
Video game sequels
Video games with alternative versions
Video games with isometric graphics